Michael Ferguson (born 23 March 1974) is an Australian politician who is currently the Deputy Premier of Tasmania since April 2022. He has been a Liberal Party member of the Tasmanian House of Assembly in the Division of Bass since the 2010 state election. Ferguson was appointed to cabinet after his party's victory in the 2014 state election and has served continuously as Minister in a range of portfolios including Finance, Health, Infrastructure, Transport, State Growth and Science and Technology. He is also the Leader of the House.

Fergie previously served in federal parliament as a Liberal Party of Australia member in the House of Representatives from 2004 to 2007, representing the federal electorate of Bass. He was defeated at the 2007 federal election.

Background and early career
He was educated at the University of Tasmania, holding degrees in Applied Science and Education. In the past, his broad community activities include many local tourism and progress associations as well as community radio. He has worked as a teacher from 1996 to 2002, and a member of the Meander Valley Council. He has received awards including winning the Regional Initiative category for the Young Australian of the Year Awards for Tasmania in 2002, and Tasmanian Young Achiever of the Year (2002) by the National Australia Day Council.

Before entering politics, he was a teacher in public secondary schools in Northern Tasmania and adviser to Guy Barnett, Liberal Senator for Tasmania.

Political career
In his first parliamentary term Ferguson concentrated on issues such as education, health, family and employment and served on numerous parliamentary and backbench committees.  He was the secretary of the Government Education, Science and Training policy committee and is acknowledged as having played a key role in brokering the passage of the Voluntary Student Unionism legislation through a hostile senate with his (implemented) proposal for a sports infrastructure transition fund.

Soon after the 2007 election Ferguson was appointed as the CEO of the Clifford Craig Medical Research Trust.

He was subsequently elected to the Tasmanian House of Assembly at the 2010 state election, securing the highest number of primary votes in Bass (1.5 quotas) and the second highest vote in the state.  In April 2010 Ferguson was appointed as Shadow Minister for Education and Skills; and Shadow Minister for Innovation, Science and Technology.

Ferguson was re-elected at the 2014 state election, at which the Liberals gained government, and was appointed Minister for Health and Minister for Information Technology and Innovation.

As Health Minister, Ferguson has led an ambitious and somewhat contentious reform of the Tasmanian health system by merging the previously three health services into one and changing the services delivered at each of the four hospitals in the state. He has also taken charge of the redevelopment of the Royal Hobart Hospital to ensure that the much-promised building eventuates.

His tenure has not been without incident with his appointment of an interim CEO of the merged health service having a side interest in alternative therapies and a series of electrical and computer failures at the ambulance service.

In January 2020, Premier Will Hodgman resigned and Ferguson was a candidate to succeed him as Premier and Liberal leader but ultimately withdrew from the leadership contest. Treasurer Peter Gutwein was instead elected unopposed as Hodgman's successor. There was speculation that Ferguson would succeed Gutwein as Treasurer but in the end Premier Gutwein chose to retain the Treasury portfolio.

On 8 April 2022, after Gutwein resigned as Premier, deputy party leader Jeremy Rockliff became party leader, and Ferguson was elected as deputy party premier to replace Rockliff. Ferguson was sworn in as Deputy Premier of Tasmania that afternoon.

Political views
Ferguson has been described as a "conservative" Liberal, and is opposed to same-sex marriage and abortion. In 2018, he criticised the Tasmanian Greens and the Labor Party for their reforms to make birth certificates gender-optional, citing it as a social experiment on children that Tasmanian parents would be "disgusted" by.

References

External links
Michael Ferguson – official site
Clifford Craig Medical Research Trust

1974 births
Living people
Liberal Party of Australia members of the Parliament of Tasmania
Liberal Party of Australia members of the Parliament of Australia
Members of the Australian House of Representatives for Bass
Members of the Australian House of Representatives
Members of the Tasmanian House of Assembly
Deputy Premiers of Tasmania
Treasurers of Tasmania
21st-century Australian politicians
People from Burnie, Tasmania